Bardhi is a surname. Notable persons with that name include:

Catholic clergy 
 Tosol Bardhi (1490–1582), Albanian prelate of the Roman Catholic Church
 Nikollë Bardhi (1551–1617), Albanian prelate of the Roman Catholic Church
 Gjergj Bardhi (1575–1646), Albanian prelate of the Roman Catholic Church
 Frang Bardhi (1606–1643), Albanian bishop and author of the early eras of Albanian literature

Others 
 Mehdi Bardhi (1927–1994), Yugoslav linguist, author, and teacher of Kosovar-Albanian descent
 Reshat Bardhi (1935–2011), Albanian religious leader of an Islamic order
 Gazment Bardhi (1986), Albania's Minister of Justice in 2017
 Enis Bardhi (1995), Macedonian professional footballer
 Bardhi (1997), born as Bardhyl Idrizi, Macedonian-Albanian rapper